Ahmad Mohammad Ali al-Hada is an al-Qaeda operative from Yemen whose family is described by US government officials as a "supercell" within the al-Qaeda network.

Early life and Al-Qaeda
Al-Hada is native of Dhamar Governorate, and is a veteran of Soviet–Afghan War, where he met Osama Bin Laden. It's reported that al-Hada was a close friend of Bin Laden. From 1996 til 2006, was operating along with his son, Samir Al-Hada, an Qaeda safe house and a communication center in Sana'a, which was the direct link from AQ central to Yemen. He was captured by the Yemeni government in 2006, but was set free, possibly after a tribal deal. As of 2007, his whereabouts are unknown.

Family
Al-Hada's son-in-law, Khalid al-Mihdhar, was one of the hijackers that flew American Airlines Flight 77 into the Pentagon as part of the September 11 attacks. Another son-in-law, Mustafa Abdulkader, has been listed on FBI terror alerts. In February 2002, Al-Hada's son, Sameer al-Hada, committed suicide using a hand grenade, to avoid questioning by security forces about the Cole bombing. Two of Ahmed Al-Hada’s brothers were killed in Afghanistan during operation “Absolute Justice” and a third brother, Abdullah Al-Hada, is wanted by the Yemen authorities for terror charges.

USS Cole bombing
Al-Hada allegedly provided the telephone number in Yemen that served as the switchboard for al-Qaeda operations leading up to the USS Cole bombing and September 11 attacks. In The Looming Tower he was cited  as being in Yemeni custody.

References

Yemeni al-Qaeda members
People from Dhamar Governorate
Year of birth missing (living people)
Living people